Ascent of Mount Carmel is a 16th-century spiritual treatise by Spanish Catholic mystic and poet Saint John of the Cross. The book is a systematic treatment of the ascetical life in pursuit of mystical union with Christ, giving advice and reporting on his own experience. Alongside another connected work by John, entitled The Dark Night, it details the so-called Dark Night of the Soul, when the individual Soul undergoes earthly and spiritual privations in search of union with God. These two works, together with John's The Living Flame of Love and the Spiritual Canticle, are regarded as some of the greatest works both in Christian mysticism and in the Spanish language.

Written between 1578 and 1579 in Granada, Spain, after his escape from prison, the Ascent is illustrated by a diagram of the process outlined in the text of the Soul's progress to the summit of the metaphorical Mount Carmel where God is encountered. The work is divided into three sections and is set out as a commentary on four poetic stanzas by John on the subject of the Dark Night. John shows how the Soul sets out to leave all worldly ties and appetites behind to achieve "nothing less than transformation in God".

Text of Dark Night of the Soul

Considered to be his introductory work on mystical theology, this work begins with an allegorical poem, Dark Night of the Soul. The rest of the text begins as a detailed explanation and interpretation of the poem, but after explaining the first five lines, John thereafter ignores the poem and writes a straightforward treatise on the two "active nights" of the soul.

The poem is as follows:

Influence 
John's spiritual method of inner purgation along the 'negative way' was an enormous influence on T. S. Eliot when he came to write the Four Quartets. John's poem contains these famous lines of self-abnegation leading to spiritual rebirth:

To reach satisfaction in all
desire its possession in nothing.
To come to possession in all
desire the possession of nothing.
To arrive at being all
desire to be nothing.
To come to the knowledge of all
desire the knowledge of nothing.
To come to the pleasure you have not
you must go by the way in which you enjoy not.
To come to the knowledge you have not
you must go by the way in which you know not.
To come to the possession you have not
you must go by the way in which you possess not.
To come by the what you are not
you must go by a way in which you are not.
When you turn toward something
you cease to cast yourself upon the all.
For to go from all to the all
you must deny yourself of all in all.
And when you come to the possession of the all
you must possess it without wanting anything.
Because if you desire to have something in all
your treasure in God is not purely your all.

Ascent of Mount Carmel became one of inspiration sources for Alejandro Jodorowsky's 1973 film The Holy Mountain, along with Mount Analogue by René Daumal.

References

John of the Cross: Selected Writings - translated & introduced by Kieran Kavanaugh OCD. Preface by Ernest Larkin, O. Carm. Paulist Press

External links

 The Ascent Of Mount Carmel at Christian Classics Ethereal Library
 

16th-century Christian texts
History of Christianity in Spain
Catholic Church in Spain
Christian mysticism
1570s books
Christian devotional literature
Books by John of the Cross
Mount Carmel